Oak (stylised OAK) is an Australian pasteurised flavoured milk brand owned by French multinational corporation Lactalis. It was first established in 1967 in New South Wales, as the general dairy brand of the Raymond Terrace Co-operative and its successor the Hunter Valley Co-operative Dairy Company. The origin of the Oak brand goes back to 1903. Oak flavoured milk was launched into Queensland, South Australia and Victoria in 1998. It was discontinued in Victoria in 2006 but relaunched back in 2010. Oak launched into Western Australia in October 2013.

Products

Oak flavoured milk comes in the following flavours:
 Chocolate (core product)
 Strawberry (core product)
 Banana (core product)
 Vanilla Malt (core product)
 Arthur's Roostermilk (core product)
 Iced Coffee
 Egg Nog (available in South Australia)
 Gold Caramel White Choc (launched May 2020)

In collaboration with Allen's (a confectionery company owned by Nestlé) and Nestlé, Oak has also offered the following limited edition flavoured milks:
 Allen's Jaffas (launched October 2019 – no longer available)
 Allen's Red Skins (launched October 2019
 Allen's Chokito (launched October 2019
 Allen's Pineapples (launched April 2020)
 Nestle Peppermint Crisp (launched April 2020)
 Allen's Fantales (launched April 2020)

Oak limited edition flavours no longer available:
 Cookies & Cream (launched September 2015)
 Strong Iced Coffee (launched March 2016)
 
 Mocha (launched October 2018)
 Cinnamon Donut (launched August 2019, exclusive to Woolworths)

In collaboration with 7-Eleven, Oak had released the following limited edition flavours exclusively for their stores:
 Mocha (launched March 2015, re-released as non-exclusive in October 2018)
 Choc Peanut Butter (launched July 2015)
 Caramel Coffee (launched June 2016)
 Choc Malt (launched April 2017)
 Blue Heaven (launched October 2017)
 Lime Spider (launched March 2018)
 Caramel Popcorn (launched September 2018)
 Rocky Road (launched March 2019) 
 Cola Spider (launched October 2019)

Oak also mocked up packaging for, but never produced, the following flavours:
 Vegan Carob (part of an advertising campaign that mocked vegan foods)
 Choc Hazelnut (proposed new 7-Eleven exclusive flavour that lost in selection competition to Blue Heaven flavour)
 Vanilla Crumble (proposed new 7-Eleven exclusive flavour that lost in selection competition to Blue Heaven flavour)

Oak has also been sold in frozen chocolate soft serve form (since January 2017) in limited locations seasonally. Oak also is available in UHT long life format, in strawberry and chocolate flavours.

In 2013, Oak released 'The Max' range, beginning with Cool Choc Mint in May 2013, Molten Caramel in October 2013 (Oak's first shake to thicken drink), and the limited edition Chilly Choc Chilli in March 2015. In November 2017, the Oak Thick range was also released, that thickens after shaking to give a thick-shake like mouthfeel. It launched in Death by Chocolate, Vanilla Killa, Choc Mint and Salted Caramel flavours, at Woolworths. A similar product, Oak mini shake, that contains less sugar and that is sold in 250ml was released in October 2019 in chocolate and strawberry flavours.

In April 2017, Oak launched Oak Plus, a sports recovery flavoured milk drink, with added protein. It is available in vanilla, chocolate, banana & honey flavours.

The Oak brand has also stretched across a range of dairy foods in the past, such as ice cream, cottage cheese, butter, custard, cream and frozen yoghurt.

Nutrition

The nutritional values vary by flavour, however chocolate, strawberry, banana, vanilla malt, iced coffee are similar.  The Oak Max and Light Chocolate contain approximately 25% fewer calories and approximately half the fat of chocolate milk. In contrast, Egg Nog has approximately 25% more energy and 50% more fat than chocolate milk, and Oak Plus, which was launched in early 2017, contains around 30g more protein. The values for chocolate milk are:

Ownership
Since 2019, the Oak brand has been wholly owned by Lactalis – a multinational French dairy and food corporation. Lactalis acquired Parmalat in stages between 2011 and 2019, who in turn had acquired the Oak brand from Dairy Farmers in July 2009, six months after Dairy Farmers was bought by National Foods.

Sponsorship
Oak are premier partner sponsors of National Rugby League team, the Penrith Panthers.

Oak have previously been sponsors of the Newcastle Jets, the Newcastle Knights, the Melbourne Stars and the Port Adelaide Football Club.

Oak Milk Bars

Several Oak-branded milk bars have operated in the Hunter region in the past, in locations such as Newcastle, Hexham, Peats Ridge and Freemans Waterhole. Many of the milk bars were mapped out down the main route north from Sydney.

The Oak Milk Bar at Freemans Waterhole still operates as a milk bar. An Oak Milk Bar opened in Rutherford September 2020.

External links

References

Australian companies established in 1973
Lactalis
Australian drinks
Brand name dairy products
Flavored milk
Products introduced in 1967
Dairy products companies of Australia